Comic Boyz was a Taiwanese vocal quintet boy band, composed of Kingone Wang, Figaro Tseng, Peter Chang, Shone An, Arroy Shen and Eddie Hsu. Despite the publicity and making appearance in Taiwanese dramas, Comic Boyz was not as successful as expected, especially since they kept being compared to their predecessor, F4.  They disbanded in 2005 after the release of their farewell album Goodbye Comic Boyz.

History

2001: Band formation
In 2001, after the success of F4, Comic Ritz Production was looking to create a new group to fulfill the 'boy band craze' in Taiwan. The first selection left them with 11 potential candidates for the group. The 11 young men underwent training and part of the training was to host TV shows. After six months of training, they were evaluated based on their performance. Five members were eliminated and the remaining six formed the official group. The six men were Kingone Wang, Figaro Tseng, Shone An, Arroy Shen, Peter Chang, and Eddie Hsu.

In 2002, right after their first album was released, Hsu slipped and fell on the floor while practicing a dance routine. He suffered several bone fractures that would require 3–4 months of absence to recover. After consideration, Hsu decided to leave the group and focus on school work. Since he used to be the group leader, the management team put Wang as the leader of the group.

2005: Split

Since the disbandment, Wang, Tseng, and Shen remain active in the entertainment industry.  Wang became a successful actor. He won Taiwanese Golden Bell Awards for Best Supporting Actor. Tseng is also an active actor and painter. Chang returned to school and worked for some commonplace jobs until 2012. Since 2013, he has been in the catering industry.

Shen went on to become a host in some entertainment shows but he died on 19 October 2012, due to complications that accompanied a brain injury. His funeral was attended by all 4 other members. An left the entertainment industry around 2006, but in 2009 he became a host of a talk show until his death from liver cancer on 1 June 2015. His funeral was attended by former bandmates Wang and Chang.

Members

Discography

Album list

Notable songs 
 "Youth Souvenir Book" (青春纪念册) – It's widely considered as Comic's most renowned song.
 "Hey! Hah!"
 "Red Dragonfly" (红蜻蜓)
 "Number 2"
 "Hold Me Close"

References

Mandopop musical groups
Taiwanese boy bands
2001 establishments in Taiwan
Musical groups established in 2001
2005 disestablishments in Taiwan
Musical groups disestablished in 2005
Sony Music